Yellow Bank is an unincorporated community in Franklin County, Indiana, in the United States.

History
Yellow Bank took its name from the Yellow Bank Creek upon which it is situated. A mill was built at the mouth of Yellow Bank Creek as early as 1812.

References

Unincorporated communities in Franklin County, Indiana
Unincorporated communities in Indiana